Cayman Islands competed at the 2012 Summer Olympics in London, United Kingdom from 27 July to 12 August 2012. This was the nation's ninth appearance at the Olympics, except the 1980 Summer Olympics in Moscow due to the United States-led boycott.

Five athletes from the Cayman Islands were selected to the team, participating only in athletics and swimming. Sprinter Kemar Hyman was the only athlete to compete at his first Olympics. Veteran sprinter Cydonie Mothersill, on the other hand, became the only female and the oldest athlete of the team, competing at her fifth Olympics. Swimmer Brett Fraser, and his brother Shaune advanced past the first round in the men's 100 m freestyle for the first time, since its swimming team began competing in 2004. Fraser became the nation's first swimmer to carry the flag at the opening ceremony. Cayman Islands, however, has yet to win its first Olympic medal.

Athletics

Athletes from the Cayman Islands have so far achieved qualifying standards in the following athletics events (up to a maximum of 3 athletes in each event at the 'A' Standard, and 1 at the 'B' Standard):

Key
 Note – Ranks given for track events are within the athlete's heat only
 Q = Qualified for the next round
 q = Qualified for the next round as a fastest loser or, in field events, by position without achieving the qualifying target
 NR = National record
 N/A = Round not applicable for the event
 Bye = Athlete not required to compete in round

Men

Women

Swimming

Men

See also
Cayman Islands at the 2011 Pan American Games
Cayman Islands at the 2012 Winter Youth Olympics

References

External links

Nations at the 2012 Summer Olympics
2012
2012 in Caymanian sport